This is a list of countries and some dependent territories and subnational areas by incarceration rate.

Incarceration totals, rates, demographics 
The World Prison Brief (WPB) may or may not incorporate juvenile incarceration numbers into the totals for each country, dependent territory, or subnational area. The date for each item below is the latest available to WPB at the time the data was copied here. See the individual WPB country and subnational area pages for more info on dates, juvenile numbers, and much more. N/A below means that the data is not available (NA) in the info provided by WPB.

* indicates "Incarceration in LOCATION" or "Crime in LOCATION" links.
Note: For the UK as a whole see #United Kingdom in notes section.

Territories or other subnational areas 

To keep the above chart compact the country names were stripped from the territories or other subnational areas. Here is that info as provided by World Prison Brief:

Notes

Australia

In addition to the numbers referenced in the main table, see info about additional detainees, and alleged detainees, at Immigration detention in Australia and Punishment in Australia.

China
In addition to the numbers referenced in the main table, see info about additional detainees, and alleged detainees, at Re-education through labor, Laogai, and Xinjiang internment camps.

Cuba
In addition to the numbers referenced in the main table, see info about additional detainees, and alleged detainees, at Human rights in Cuba. Also at Law enforcement in Cuba.

Eritrea

World Prison Brief has limited info on Eritrea.

North Korea
World Prison Brief has limited info on North Korea. See info about detainees, and alleged detainees, at Prisons in North Korea.

Somalia

World Prison Brief has limited info on Somalia.

United Kingdom 

See also #Territories or other subnational areas higher up.
The data source (World Prison Brief) does not list an incarceration rate for the United Kingdom as a whole, with its territories, and other subnational areas, etc.. In the main table see England and Wales, Northern Ireland, Scotland, Anguilla, Bermuda, Cayman Islands, Gibraltar, Guernsey, Isle of Man, Jersey, British Virgin Islands. A rate for the United Kingdom as a whole can be calculated by adding up their prison populations, and then dividing by their combined population.

United States

The incarceration rate (per 100,000 population of all ages) is for inmates held in adult facilities in the United States. It does not include inmates in the custody of correctional facilities operated by departments of corrections in U.S. territories (American Samoa, Guam, and the U.S. Virgin Islands) and U.S. commonwealths (Northern Mariana Islands and Puerto Rico).

In addition, there were 36,479 juveniles in juvenile detention in 2019. For more juvenile detention information and numbers, see Youth incarceration in the United States.

The incarceration rate in the U.S. varies greatly by U.S. state. See: List of U.S. states and territories by incarceration and correctional supervision rate. It also breaks it down to male and female incarceration rates by state. See also: Incarceration of women in the United States.

See also 
List of prisons
List of countries by execution rate
List of countries by intentional homicide rate
List of U.S. states by homicide rate
United States incarceration rate
:Category:Penal systems by country

References

External links 

 Core Publications of the World Prison Brief. Such as the World Prison Population List, and the World Female Imprisonment List.
 Persons Detained Statistics of incarceration ("detained") from the United Nations Office on Drugs and Crime
 Data Analysis Tools – Corrections Statistical Analysis Tool (CSAT) – Prisoners. United States Bureau of Justice Statistics.

Incarceration rate